Thayer County is a county in the U.S. state of Nebraska. As of the 2020 United States Census, the population was 5,034. The county was created in 1856 and originally named Jefferson County. It was organized in 1870-1871 and renamed for General and Governor John Milton Thayer.

In the Nebraska license plate system, Thayer County is represented by the prefix 32 (it had the thirty-second-largest number of vehicles registered in the state when the license plate system was established in 1922).

Geography
Thayer County lies on the south line of Nebraska. Its south boundary line abuts the north boundary line of the state of Kansas. Its terrain consists of rolling hills, sloped toward the east. A local drainage, Big Sandy Creek, flows southeast and east through the northern part of the county, and another drainage, Rose Creek, flows northeastward through the SE corner of the county (they converge east of Thayer County's east boundary line). The planar portions of the terrain are partially used for agriculture.

Major highways

  U.S. Highway 81
  U.S. Highway 136
  Nebraska Highway 4
  Nebraska Highway 5
  Nebraska Highway 8
  Nebraska Highway 53

Adjacent counties

 Saline County – northeast
 Jefferson County – east
 Washington County, Kansas – southeast
 Republic County, Kansas – south
 Nuckolls County – west
 Fillmore County – north

Protected areas
 Prairie Marsh State Wildlife Management Area
 Prairie Marsh West State Wildlife Management Area

Demographics

As of the 2000 United States Census, there were 6,055 people, 2,541 households, and 1,689 families in the county. The population density was 10 people per square mile (4/km2). There were 2,828 housing units at an average density of 5 per square mile (2/km2). The racial makeup of the county was 98.70% White, 0.02% Black or African American, 0.28% Native American, 0.12% Asian, 0.33% from other races, and 0.56% from two or more races. 1.01% of the population were Hispanic or Latino of any race.

There were 2,541 households, out of which 27.70% had children under the age of 18 living with them, 58.80% were married couples living together, 5.00% had a female householder with no husband present, and 33.50% were non-families. 31.50% of all households were made up of individuals, and 18.20% had someone living alone who was 65 years of age or older. The average household size was 2.31 and the average family size was 2.90.

The county population contained 24.10% under the age of 18, 4.90% from 18 to 24, 22.30% from 25 to 44, 24.20% from 45 to 64, and 24.50% who were 65 years of age or older. The median age was 44 years. For every 100 females there were 95.80 males. For every 100 females age 18 and over, there were 92.80 males.

The median income for a household in the county was $30,740, and the median income for a family was $38,346. Males had a median income of $26,964 versus $18,275 for females. The per capita income for the county was $17,043. About 7.60% of families and 10.70% of the population were below the poverty line, including 14.80% of those under age 18 and 11.00% of those age 65 or over.

Communities

Cities 

 Deshler
 Hebron (county seat)

Villages 

 Alexandria
 Belvidere
 Bruning
 Byron
 Carleton
 Chester
 Davenport
 Gilead
 Hubbell

Politics
Thayer County voters are reliably Republican. In only one national election since 1936 has the county selected the Democratic Party candidate (as of 2020).

See also
 National Register of Historic Places listings in Thayer County NE

References

External links

 
1871 establishments in Nebraska
Populated places established in 1871